Soundtrack #1 is a South Korean streaming television series starring Park Hyung-sik and Han So-hee. It was released on March 23, 2022, exclusively on Disney+ in selected territories.

Synopsis 
A man and a woman who have been best friends for 20 years, get to know each other while staying in the same house for two weeks.

Cast and characters

Main 
 Park Hyung-sik as Han Seon-woo, a photographer.
 Han So-hee as Lee Eun-soo, a lyricist.

Supporting 
 Yoon Byung-hee as Dong-hyeon
 Kim Joo-hun as Kang Woo-il
 Lee Jung-eun as Eun-soo's mother

Special appearances 
 Park Hoon as Gyeol-han
 Park Min-jung as Ma-ri
 Seo In-guk as Jay Jun
 Yoon Seo-ah as Kim Seo-yeon

Original soundtrack

Reception

Audience viewership 
Soundtrack #1 was ranked first among the most-watched series on Disney+ in South Korea, Japan, Singapore, Hong Kong, and Taiwan, during the week of March 26, 2022.

Critical reception 
Ayushi Agrawal of Pinkvilla found the series reassuring and homely, stating that while it does not bring something new, the show manages to be a convincing love story, and praised the performances of Park Hyung-sik and Han So-hee. Tanu I. Raj of New Musical Express rated the series 4 out of 5 stars and found it to be "one of the most sublime offerings of this summer." Raj called the relationship between the lead characters intimate, realistic, and sensitive, and praised the dialogues and the visuals, while complimenting the performances of the actors.

References

External links 
 
 
 

Korean-language television shows
2022 South Korean television series debuts
2022 South Korean television series endings
South Korean romance television series
Star (Disney+) original programming
South Korean web series
South Korean pre-produced television series